Gassendiceras is an extinct genus of ammonoid cephalopods belonging to the family Hemihoplitidae. They lived in the Cretaceous period, Barremian age.

Etymology
The genus name Gassendiceras honors the French philosopher and scientist Pierre Gassendi (1592 – 1655).

Species

 Gassendiceras quelquejeui Bert, Delanoy & Bersac, 2006
 Gassendiceras alpinum (d'Orbigny, 1850) (Synonym Crioceras alpinum)
 Gassendiceras enayi Bert, Delanoy & Bersac, 2006
 Gassendiceras coulletae Bert, Delanoy & Bersac, 2006
 Gassendiceras hammatoptychum (Uhlig, 1883)

Description

Distribution
Fossils of species within this genus have been found in the Cretaceous rocks of southeastern France.

References

 D. Bert, G. Delanoy & S. Bersac, « Descriptions de représentants nouveaux ou peu connus de la famille des Hemihoplitidae Spath, 1924 (Barrémien supérieur, Sud-Est de la France) : conséquences taxinomiques et phylétiques », Ann. Mus. Hist. Nat. Nice, vol. 21 (2006), p. 179-253
 Bert, Delanoy & Bersac  Problems in the identity of "Crioceras" barremense Kilian,  1895  (Ancyloceratida, Late Barremian), and their proposed resolution

Cretaceous ammonites
Ammonitida genera
Ancyloceratoidea